Thomas Roger Trautmann is an American historian, cultural anthropologist, and Professor Emeritus of History and Anthropology at the University of Michigan. He is considered a leading expert on the Arthashastra, the ancient Hindu text on statecraft, economic policy, and military strategy, written in Sanskrit. Trautmann has mentored many students during his tenure at the University of Michigan. His studies focus on ancient India, the history of anthropology, and other related subjects. Trautmann's work in Indology has been credited with illuminating the underlying economic philosophy that governed ancient Indian kinship. He has also written book-length studies on both Dravidian and American Indian kinship. His most recent study concerns the use of the elephant in ancient India.

Trautmann began as an assistant professor in 1968, teaching his entire career at Ann Arbor until he was awarded emeritus status. He has served as director of the University of Michigan History Department, as well as head of the Center for South Asian Studies. From 1997 to 2006, he served as the editor of Comparative Studies in Society and History. He was honored with a festschrift in 2011. Born and raised in Madison, Wisconsin, he completed his undergraduate work at Beloit College and holds a PhD from the University of London, where he wrote his dissertation on the structure and composition of the Sanskrit text Arthasastra (published in book form in 1971).

Works

References

Further reading
  – review of 1997 work
  – interview
 Aryans and British India – a review by the Indian historian, D. N. Jha.

21st-century American historians
21st-century American male writers
American Indologists
Living people
Alumni of the University of London
University of Michigan faculty
Beloit College alumni
Historians of South Asia
Historians of India
Sanskrit–English translators
1940 births
21st-century translators
American male non-fiction writers